Gur-e-Baba Ali (also Romanized as Gūr-e-Bābā Alī and Gūrbābā ‘Alī; also known as Kūr Bābā ‘Alī) is a village in Obatu Rural District, Karaftu District, Divandarreh County, Kurdistan Province, Iran. At the 2006 census, its population was 386, in 75 families. The village is populated by Kurds.

References 

Towns and villages in Divandarreh County
Kurdish settlements in Kurdistan Province